Lewis Carter (2 May 1925 – 28 May 2006) was an Australian cricketer. He played five first-class cricket matches for Victoria between 1946 and 1954.

See also
 List of Victoria first-class cricketers

References

External links
 

1925 births
2006 deaths
Australian cricketers
Victoria cricketers
Cricketers from Melbourne